The Universal Declaration of Human Rights was drafted between early 1947 and late 1948 by a committee formed by the United Nations Commission on Human Rights. Further discussion and amendments were made by the Commission on Human Rights, the Economic and Social Council and the General Assembly of the United Nations.

Cassin compared the Declaration to the portico of a Greek temple, with a foundation, steps, four columns, and a pediment.
Members of the Commission who contributed significantly to the creation of the Declaration included Canadian John Peters Humphrey of the United Nations Secretariat, Eleanor Roosevelt of the United States (who chaired the Drafting Committee), René Cassin of France, Charles Malik of Lebanon, P. C. Chang of Republic of China, and Hansa Jivraj Mehta of India among others. While not a member of the drafting committee, the French philosopher Jacques Maritain was influential in the lead up to the drafting of the Universal Declaration, advocacy for it within UNESCO in 1947–1948, and in its subsequent advancement.

Membership of the Drafting Committee 
The Drafting Committee included
Eleanor Roosevelt,                   United States (Chair) 
P. C. Chang,                         Republic of China
Charles Malik,                       Lebanon
William Roy Hodgson,                 Australia
Hernán Santa Cruz,                   Chile
René Cassin,                         France
Alexander E. Bogomolov,              Soviet Union
Charles Dukes, 1st Baron Dukeston,   United Kingdom
John Peters Humphrey,                Canada

The drafting process 
John Peters Humphrey was newly appointed as Director of the Division of Human Rights within the United Nations Secretariat. In this role, he produced the first draft of a list of rights that were to form the basis of the Declaration.

The underlying structure of the Universal Declaration was introduced in its second draft which was prepared by René Cassin working from the Humphrey draft.  The structure was influenced by the Code Napoleon, including a preamble and introductory general principles.
In Cassin's model, the last three articles of the Declaration provide the pediment which binds the structure together. These articles are concerned with the duty of the individual to society and the prohibition of use of rights in contravention of the purposes of the United Nations.
Cassin compared the Declaration to the portico of a Greek temple, with a foundation, steps, four columns and a pediment.

The Cassin draft was submitted to the Commission on Human Rights and was to undergo editing in the commission, then in further drafts considered by the Third Committee of the United Nations, and finally in a draft before the General Assembly of the United Nations, which ultimately adopted the Declaration on 10 December 1948. The vote for the declaration was 48 to 0, with eight abstentions: the Byelorussian Soviet Socialist Republic, Czechoslovakia, the People's Republic of Poland, the Kingdom of Saudi Arabia, the Ukrainian Soviet Socialist Republic, the Union of South Africa, the Union of Soviet Socialist Republics, and the Socialist Federal Republic of Yugoslavia.

Controversies 
The first controversy to resolve was related to the very origin of the human rights, basically the discussion between the supporters of the concepts of natural rights (which humans are endowed by God or Nature) and positive rights (which humans acquire as a result of a rational agreement).

The second controversy was basically between the positions of the Marxist theory of the Soviet Bloc and the liberal theory of the Western World. In philosophical terms, the Soviet Bloc criticized the individualist stance of the issue, arguing in favor of the collectivism approach, where the rights of the collective dominate that of an individual. In political terms, the Soviet Union and its satellites, facing mounting accusations of human rights violations, argued that the declaration is a mere formality if it would not consider guarantees of economic and social rights. However these objections were of surprisingly little consequence, because the Soviet Bloc was not very active during the seating of the commission, perhaps indicating a preestablished decision not to sign the Declaration.

Another issue is the legal status of the declaration. The majority considered the document to be mainly of moral character. At the same time some participants argued in favor of adding certain legal aspects in terms of international law.

British representatives in particular were extremely frustrated that the proposal had moral but no legal obligation. (It was not until 1976 that the International Covenant on Civil and Political Rights came into force, giving a legal status to most of the Declaration)

UDHR timeline 
Source: United Nations Year Book 1948–1949, pp. 524 et seq

1945 
 United Nations Conference on International Organization, San Francisco

1946 
 15 February, Establishment of "Nuclear Committee" of Commission on Human Rights.
 29 April - 20 May 1946 - First Meeting of the Nuclear Committee.
 21 June 1946 - The UN Economic and Social Council adopts terms of reference of permanent Commission on Human Rights

1947 
 27 January - 10 February - First Meeting of the Commission on Human Rights, Lake Success, New York.  Drafting Committee established.
 9 June - 25 June - First Meeting of the Drafting Committee, Lake Success, New York.   Draft outline of an International Bill of Human Rights prepared by the UN Secretariat ("the Humphrey Draft").  Drafting Committee splits work into two documents:  preparation of a declaration of human rights and a working paper on a draft international convention on human rights.
 2 December - 17 December - Second Session of the Commission on Human Rights, Geneva.  Commission begins to consider work on three projects:  a declaration on human rights, and international convention on human rights and measures for implementation and enforcement

1948 
 3 May - 21 May, Second Session of the Drafting Committee, Lake Success, New York.
 24 May - 18 June, Third Session of the Commission on Human Rights, Lake Success, New York.  Commission adopts a draft Declaration and transmits it to the Economic and Social Council.
 26 August, Economic and Social Council transmits draft to the General Assembly.
 21 September – Third session of the United Nations General Assembly begins
 30 September - 7 December, Third Committee of General Assembly spends 81 meetings considering the Declaration.  168 resolutions for amendments to the draft, submitted and considered.
 1–4 December, Sub-committee of Third Committee charged with cross checking 5 official language versions.
 10 December, Universal Declaration of Human Rights adopted by the United Nations General Assembly

Notes

References

Further reading 
 Johannes Morsink, The Universal Declaration of Human Rights: Origins, Drafting & Intent (Philadelphia: University of Pennsylvania Press, 1999).
 Mary Ann Glendon, A World Made New:  Eleanor Roosevelt and the Universal Declaration of Human Rights, Random House New York, 2001
 Universal Declaration of Human Rights pages at Columbia University (Centre for the Study of Human Rights), including article by article commentary, video interviews, discussion of meaning, drafting and history.
 John Nurser, For All Peoples and All Nations. Christian Churches and Human Rights (Geneva: WCC Publications, 2005).

External links 
 Text of the UDHR (English)
 Official translations of the UDHR
 UDHR Facebook page
 Librivox: Human-read audio recordings in several Languages
 Resource Guide on the Universal Declaration of Human Rights (UN Library, Geneva)

 Audio-visual materials
 Video interview with Mary Ann Glendon author of "A World Made New: Eleanor Roosevelt and the Universal Declaration of Human Rights" on the drafting of the Declaration.
 Text, Audio, and Video excerpt of Eleanor Roosevelt's Address to the United Nations on the Universal Declaration of Human Rights
 Animated presentation of the Universal Declaration of Human Rights by Amnesty International, from Youtube (English, 20 minutes and 23 seconds)
 Audio: Statement by Charles Malik as Representative of Lebanon to the Third Committee of the UN General Assembly on the Universal Declaration, 6 November 1948. 
 UN Department of Public Information introduction to the drafters of the Declaration.
 UN video archives of speeches on adoption of the Declaration.

1948 in law
Human rights instruments
United Nations General Assembly resolutions
History of human rights
1947 in the United Nations
1948 in the United Nations